Zaliab (also Romanized as Zālīāb; also known as Zālīābād) is a village in Gerit Rural District, Papi District, Khorramabad County, Lorestan Province, Iran. At the 2006 census, its population was 285, in 51 families.

References 

Towns and villages in Khorramabad County